Aminoalkylindoles (AAIs) are a family of cannabinergic compound that act as a cannabinoid receptor agonist.  They were invented by pharmaceutical company Sterling-Winthrop in the early 1990s as potential nonsteroidal anti-inflammatory agents.

Legality

Aminoalkylindoles are now commonly found in synthetic cannabis designer drugs.

In the United States, the DEA added the aminoalkylindoles JWH-200 to Schedule I of the Controlled Substances Act on 1 March 2011 for 12 months.

References

External links
 Aminoalkylindoles, ChEBI